The Amazon Temple Quest is a fantasy novel by English writer Katherine Roberts. The novel was first published in 2002, and it is the third book in The Seven Fabulous Wonders series.

Plot summary
Lysippe, an Amazon princess, is suffering. Her tribe has vanished and her sister has been badly wounded. The Gryphon Stone can help, but the evil Alchemist, who has taken Lysippe as his slave, is after it also. With the help of her friend Hero, who has also been enslaved, they seek sanctuary in the Temple of Artemis. There, Lysippe makes new friends and enemies. While her sister Tanis is being healed, Lysippe stays in the temple, but she sometimes ventures out resulting in finding a nymph named Smyrna. As Smyrna instructs Lysippe in Amazon ways, Lysippe is formulating a plan to rid of the Alchemist and finally be free again.

2002 British novels
British fantasy novels
Novels by Katherine Roberts
Voyager Books books